The George Fayerweather Blacksmith Shop is an historic homestead and blacksmith shop at 1859 Mooresfield Road on the eastern outskirts of the Kingston Historic District in South Kingstown, Rhode Island. It was the home of George Fayerweather, an African-American blacksmith and his family, including his wife Sarah Harris Fayerweather.  The shop was built in 1820 and was added to the National Register of Historic Places in 1984.  The property is maintained by the Kingston Improvement Association, a non-profit organization of local residents, and is now the home of the Fayerweather Craft Guild and the Kingston Garden Club.

See also
National Register of Historic Places listings in Washington County, Rhode Island

References

External links
Fayerweather House at the Kingston Improvement Association

Blacksmith shops
Houses completed in 1820
Industrial buildings completed in 1820
Industrial buildings and structures on the National Register of Historic Places in Rhode Island
Buildings and structures in South Kingstown, Rhode Island
Historic American Buildings Survey in Rhode Island
National Register of Historic Places in Washington County, Rhode Island